Agapitov (masculine) or Agapitova (feminine) is a Russian last name. It derives from the male given name Agapy (from a Greek word meaning loved one). The following notable people share this last name:
Maksim Agapitov (born 1970), Russian weightlifter and weightlifting administrator 
Sergey Agapitov, Russian actor who played Andrey in the 1994 movie Three Sisters
Shurick Agapitov, founder of Xsolla, a global payment services company for online games. An active member of Russian-speaking LGBTQIA+ community.
Svetlana Agapitova (born 1964), Russian human rights activist
Yelena Agapitova, Kazakhstani ice hockey player who participated in the 1999 Asian Winter Games

See also
Agapitovo, a rural locality (a village) in Parfenyevsky District of Kostroma Oblast, Russia;

References



Russian-language surnames